Faithful Teate (c. 1626 – 1666) was a Protestant clergyman and poet from County Cavan, Ireland. He is sometimes known as Faithful Tate or Faithfull Teate. He was the father of the poet laureate, Nahum Tate.

Background
He was the son of Faithful Teate, a doctor of divinity with whom he has often been confused. The elder Teate was made rector at Ballyhaise, Co. Cavan. Reports that he had informed on the rebels during the 1641 Rebellion, resulted in his house being burned. Two or three (sources vary) of Teate's children are reported to have died as a result of hardships endured in that period.

Career and poetry
Faithful Teate the younger entered Trinity College Dublin in 1641 at age fourteen and was later ordained into the Church of Ireland. He moved to England and studied at Cambridge before being appointed minister at Sudbury in Suffolk.   He was back in Dublin by 1660 and was rector of St. Werburgh's Church in Dublin, but his puritan principles did not allow him to accept the new restoration government's policy on episcopacy and he was sacked. He died at the age of forty in 1666.

While at Suffolk he composed a long meditative poem Ter Tria: or the Doctrine of the Three Sacred Persons, Father, Son and Spirit... (1658). The poem enjoyed considerable success in its day. It was reprinted in 1669 and a German edition and translation followed in 1699. He also wrote didactic prose including A Scripture Map of the Wilderness of Sin and Way to Canaan (1655). The first modern edition of his complete poetical works was published by Four Courts Press in 2007.

Family
This second Faithful Teate was the father of the poet laureate Nahum Tate, who went by 'Tate' rather than 'Teate' only in adulthood.  Nahum was the second of seven children born to Faithful and his wife Katherine Kenetie. The eldest of these children was also called 'Faithful'. As noted above, there is considerable confusion in earlier accounts of the family, where it was stated that the first Faithful Teate was the father, instead of the grandfather, of Nahum.   There are, in fact, three 'Faithful' Teates, the grandfather, father and brother of Nahum Tate.

References

Further reading
 Teate, Faithful, Ter Tria by Faithful Teate, ed. Angelina Lynch (Dublin: Four Courts Press, 2007) 

Irish poets
Alumni of Trinity College Dublin
17th-century Irish Anglican priests
Year of birth uncertain
1666 deaths
English male poets
1626 births